Paige Chua Qi Hui (born 25 June 1981) is a Singaporean actress.

Early life
Chua was born in Singapore on 25 June 1981. She attended Mayflower Secondary School and Serangoon Junior College before graduating from the National University of Singapore with a Bachelor of Arts. She also represented Singapore in netball, as part of the National Youth Netball team between 1997 and 1999. She was discovered at a basic modeling class, which started her four-year career as a model.

Career
Chua made her acting debut in Just in Singapore, where she was cast as the half-sister of Fiona Xie. In the latter part of 2008, she had 2 more roles in La Femme and Crime Busters x 2.

In 2010 Chua earned her first nomination for “Best Supporting Actress” in Star Awards 2010 for her character in The Dream Catchers. She made a guest appearance in Unriddle as Zhang Meilin, a girl with a dubious identity. The Score was Chua's first role as a lead actress where she played Zhou Tian Lan - an office lady with a mysterious background. She also acted in a drama series Secret Garden.

In 2011, Chua appeared in the movie It's a Great, Great World as Mu Dan, a nightclub dancer. Chua also starred alongside Chen Hanwei as his wife, Bai Xiu Ming a jovial workaholic in the drama Be Happy. Chua also hosted a lifestyle information program, LOHAS and The Activist's Journey II, an info-ed program in 2012. She won her first Star Award, Top 10 Most Popular Female Artiste at Star Awards 2012.

In 2013, Chua starred in numerous dramas including It's A Wonderful Life, 96°C Café, The Enchanted and Sudden. She had her first comedy role in the sitcom, The Recruit Diaries where she played LT Angie Chen. Chua also had a role in Okto as an inexperienced elementary school teacher in The School Bell Rings and hosted season 4 of RenovAID.

In 2014, Chua won Bottomslim Sexiest leg award at Star Awards 20. Her character as part of a chivalrous team in Against The Tide earned her a nomination for "Best Supporting Actress" in Star Awards 2015.

Chua won her second Top 10 Most Popular Female Artiste award at Star Awards 2015. In 2016, Chua participated in Beyond Words a Malaysian production, and was one of the leading actresses for If Only I Could, The Gentlemen and Soul Reaper. Chua was also cast in the drama Hero. This character was seen as a breakthrough role and earned her a nomination for "Best Supporting Actress" in Star Awards 2017. In 2017, Chua played a Navy Captain in When Duty Calls, an NS50 drama in which Mediacorp Channel 8 collaborated with Ministry of Defence and the Ministry of Home Affairs. She won her third Top 10 Most Popular Female Artistes award in Star Awards 2017. In 2018, Chua earned her first nomination for "Best Actress" in Star Awards 2018, for the housewife character she played in Mightiest Mother-in-Law. She won her fourth Top 10 Most Popular Female Artistes award in Star Awards 2018. Chua starred in the drama Blessings 2, a time travel drama between 2018 and 1918 where she played the belle of Lavender Street. Chua acted as a Nurse Clinician in the third installment of You Can Be An Angel.

Filmography

Television series and film

Hosting

Discography

Compilation albums

Awards and nominations

References

External links
 Paige Chua

Living people
Singaporean people of Hokkien descent
Singaporean film actresses
Singaporean television actresses
21st-century Singaporean actresses
National University of Singapore alumni
1981 births
Singaporean women television presenters